Alejandro Magno Trujillo Obreke (26 March 1952 – 6 January 2020) was a Chilean professional footballer who played mainly as a forward for Unión Española, O'Higgins and Audax Italiano during the 1970s. He also earned three caps for the Chile national team. In 1999, he was voted to the O'Higgins Team of the Century by fans of the club.

Nicknamed El Turco ("The Turk") for his appearance, he died on 6 January 2020 at the age of 67.

Early years
Trujillo grew up playing street football in the barrios of Estación Central. He eventually joined the youth ranks of Universidad Católica, spending a short time with them before joining the Unión Española academy when he moved to Conchalí with his family.

Club career
Trujillo made his professional debut with Unión Española in 1970, at the age of 17. After disagreements with head coach Néstor Isella over his maturity that resulted in his benching, he made the move to O'Higgins in 1973, where he made an immediate impact. In his first season with the team, he scored 16 goals, finishing as the league's fifth-leading goalscorer as O'Higgins finished in fourth place. He scored 14 league goals the following year (and 24 across all competitions), cementing himself as one of the country's most talented young forwards.

He then returned to Unión Española in 1975, winning the league title that year. They also finished as runner-ups in the 1975 Copa Libertadores. He scored seven goals in the tournament, including the game-tying goal against Universitario in the second round that sent his team to the finals, where they lost to Argentine champs Independiente.

International career
He made his international debut during a 2–0 friendly loss to Mexico in Santiago on 16 August 1972. He made two further appearances for Chile during the 1974 Copa Carlos Dittbor, the name given to the home-and-away series between Chile and Argentina that was played in the 1960s and 1970s.

Honours

Club
Unión Española
 Chilean Primera División: 1975

Individual
 O'Higgins Team of the Century: 1999

References

External links
 
 

1952 births
2020 deaths
Chilean footballers
Chile international footballers
Association football forwards
Association football midfielders
Unión Española footballers
O'Higgins F.C. footballers
Audax Italiano footballers
Chilean Primera División players
Footballers from Santiago